David Davidson may refer to:

Sports
 Dave Davidson (footballer) (1905–1969), Scottish footballer
 David Davidson (baseball) (born 1984), Canadian baseball player
 David Davidson (footballer, born 1934), Scottish footballer (Manchester City, Workington AFC)
 David Davidson (footballer, born 1986), Ghanaian footballer
 David Davidson (Queen's Park footballer) (fl. 1878–1881), footballer for Queen's Park and Scotland

Other
 David Davidson (economist) (1854–1942), Swedish economist
 David Davidson (engineer) (1884–1956), Scottish pyramidologist
 David Davidson (Scottish politician) (born 1943), Scottish politician
 David Davidson (Canadian politician) (1839–1909), lumberman and politician in Ontario, Canada
 David Davidson (film director) (born 1953), American film director
 David A. Davidson, Chief of Police of the Los Angeles Police Department
 David Bruce Davidson (born 1961), electrical engineer
 David L. Davidson, first Town Planning Commissioner of Western Australia
 Sir David Davidson (1811–1900), East India Company army officer and innovator of rifle bullets and telescopic sights

See also
 David David (disambiguation)